John Michael McCarthy (born October 12, 1962) is an American commentator for Bellator MMA, former mixed martial arts referee, best known for officiating numerous bouts promoted by the Ultimate Fighting Championship (UFC), dating back to UFC 2. He co-hosts the MMA and combat sports podcast "Weighing In" with Josh Thomson.

Biography
McCarthy spent some time as an officer of the Los Angeles Police Department, retiring around 2008.

In 1993, he became involved with the newly created Ultimate Fighting Championship (UFC) fighting tournament. He was the referee for UFC 1, launching a career as a UFC referee. The UFC initially started with very few rules, but McCarthy gave feedback that it was too dangerous and suggested additional rules, many of which were adopted. McCarthy often starts matches by saying "let's get it on" to the fighters, and this has become an iconic catchphrase that is associated with him and his refereeing.

The nickname of "Big John" came about because of his size and stature. He stands  and weighs ; making him larger than the majority of the athletes over whom he presides. According to a UFC interview, the nickname was given to him by UFC co-founder and promoter Art Davie. McCarthy recalls that the nickname began when he forcibly lifted Davie off the ground and held him in the air.

In 2018, McCarthy retired from UFC refereeing, and moved to Bellator as a commentator.

Awards
World MMA Awards
Referee of the Year (Three times; 2015, 2016 and 2017)
MMA Freak
MMA Freak Hall of Fame Class of 2013 .

Personal life
McCarthy has two sons and a daughter, one of whom has been an MMA judge since 2013. McCarthy currently resides in Tennessee.

Published work
On September 1, 2011, McCarthy's autobiography,  Let's Get It On - The Making of MMA and its Ultimate Referee, was published.

Film and television
McCarthy had a cameo appearance in the Friends episode, "The one with the Ultimate Fighting Champion".

McCarthy also served as the referee on the MTV2 series Bully Beatdown, along with professional mixed martial artist Jason "Mayhem" Miller.

McCarthy is featured in the award-winning mixed martial arts documentary Fight Life, the film is directed by James Z. Feng and released in 2013.

McCarthy appeared in Season 3b, Episode 5 of Entourage.

McCarthy appeared at the end of the film Never Back Down 2 The Beat Down.

References

External links
 COMMAND officiating official site
 
 List of bouts refereed by "Big" John McCarthy on Tapology
 

1962 births
American color commentators
American podcasters
American practitioners of Brazilian jiu-jitsu
Los Angeles Police Department officers
Living people
Mixed martial arts broadcasters
Mixed martial arts referees
Sportspeople from Los Angeles